Wendy Allnutt (born 1 May 1946) is an English stage and screen actress.

She now teaches at the Guildhall School of Music and Drama, leading a degree course in Training Actors Movement.

Life

Born in Lincoln, Allnutt trained for an acting career at the Central School of Speech and Drama from 1963 to 1966. She soon gained many parts on and off stage, and a full-face portrait of her filled the cover of TV Times magazine dated 3 February 1968.

In 1967, Dennis Potter sent Allnutt what has been called a love-letter in print, in which he said 

Allnutt had met fellow actor Colin McCormack in her first year at the Central School of Speech and Drama and married him in East Berkshire in 1968. They were still together when McCormack died in 2004 and had two children together, Katherine and Andrew McCormack.

As well as her work on screen, she also appeared in Royal Shakespeare Company productions and in West End theatre. She went on to develop a second career in teaching, working at the London Academy of Music and Dramatic Art and the Guildhall School of Music and Drama, and also teaching courses in Italy. In 2003, she was the choreographer for a production of Oliver Goldsmith's She Stoops to Conquer.

FilmsOh! What a Lovely War (1969), as Flo SmithAll Coppers Are... (1972) as PegFrom Beyond the Grave (1974), as PamelaWhen Eight Bells Toll (1971), as Sue KirksidePriest of Love (1984) as Maria Huxley

TelevisionThis list is not completeThe Avengers: Invasion of the Earthmen (1969), as SarahBel Ami (1971), as Suzanne WalterThe Regiment (1972–1973), as Charlotte GauntNapoleon and Love (1974), as Madame TallienMan about the House (1975), as SusanKing Lear (BBC, 1976), as CordeliaJohn Macnab (1976), as Agatha RadenJuliet Bravo (series 1, 1980), as Jennie RandallSorry!, as Annette (series 1) and Jennifer (series 6)Dear John'' (1987), as Wendy

Notes

External links
 
 Wendy Allnutt at BFI

1946 births
20th-century English actresses
Alumni of the Royal Central School of Speech and Drama
Academics of the Guildhall School of Music and Drama
English choreographers
English film actresses
English stage actresses
English television actresses
Instructors of the London Academy of Music and Dramatic Art
Living people
Royal Shakespeare Company members
People from Lincoln, England